Russell Stuart Edmonds (born 9 September 1977) is a former English cricketer. Edmonds was a right-handed batsman who played primarily as a wicketkeeper. He was born in Blackburn, Lancashire.

Edmonds represented the Lancashire Cricket Board in 2 List A matches against Suffolk and the Essex Cricket Board in the 2000 NatWest Trophy. In his 2 List A matches, he scored 15 runs at a batting average of 15.00, with a high score of 15*. Behind the stumps he took a single catch and made a single stumping.

References

External links
Russell Edmonds at Cricinfo
Russell Edmonds at CricketArchive

1977 births
Living people
Cricketers from Blackburn
English cricketers
Lancashire Cricket Board cricketers
Wicket-keepers